Mount Jahanbin (32°11′18″N   50°40′46″E) is a  mountain in Chaharmahal and Bakhtiari Province, central Iran. Jahanbin mount is about 2 km west of the Hafshejan City, 15 km south of Shahrekord and 100 km in south-west of Isfahan. Mount Jahanbin is part of Zagros mountain range which runs along the northwest to southeast of Iran. The name Jahan(world) and -bin (see) means that the summit of the mount has a long (beautiful)view and sight seen. From the geological point of view Jahanbin mount in made of limestones from the Cretaceous period located in the folded Zagros geological structure.

Mountains of Chaharmahal and Bakhtiari Provinces
Landforms of Chaharmahal and Bakhtiari Province
Mountains of Iran